The smallbelly catshark (Apristurus indicus) is a catshark of the family Scyliorhinidae found in the western Indian Ocean  near Somalia, the Gulf of Aden, and Oman, at depths between 1,300 and 1,840 m.  Its length is up to 34 cm, although this measurement is of an immature specimen. The smallbelly catshark is not well known. It is found on continental slopes, and is probably caught by bottom trawlers. The reproduction of the smallbelly catshark is oviparous.

References

 

smallbelly catshark
Vertebrates of the Arabian Peninsula
Fish of Somalia
Fish of the Indian Ocean
Marine fauna of Southern Africa
smallbelly catshark
smallbelly catshark